Zobeydeh-ye Ariyez (also Romanized as Zobeydeh-ye ‘Arīyeẕ; also known as Zobeyd-e ‘Arīyeẕ and Zubeyd) is a village in Howmeh-ye Gharbi Rural District, in the Central District of Ramhormoz County, Khuzestan Province, Iran. At the 2006 census, its population was 215, in 39 families.

References 

Populated places in Ramhormoz County